The 2000 Kerry Senior Football Championship was the 100th staging of the Kerry Senior Football Championship since its establishment by the Kerry County Board in 1889. The draw for the opening round fixtures took place on 9 May 2000. The championship ran from 11 June to 26 November 2000.

East Kerry entered the championship as the defending champions, however, they were beaten by West Kerry in the first round.

The final was played on 26 November 2000 at Austin Stack Park in Tralee, between Dr. Crokes and An Ghaeltacht, in what was their first ever meeting in the final. Dr. Crokes won the match by 1-04 to 0-06 to claim their sixth championship title overall and a first title in nine years.

West Kerry's Dara Ó Cinnéide was the championship's top scorer with 3-20.

Results

Preliminary round

Round 1

Quarter-finals

Semi-finals

Final

Championship statistics

Top scorers

Overall

In a single game

Miscellaneous
 Dr. Crokes won a first title in nine years.
 An Ghaeltacht qualified for the final for the very first time.
 Glenflesk play in the Munster Senior Club Football Championship after winning the once off Millennium Cup.

References

Kerry Senior Football Championship
2000 in Gaelic football